is a Japanese football player for Suzuka Unlimited FC.

Club career statistics
Updated to 23 February 2017.

References

External links

Twitter Account
Instagram Account

1981 births
Living people
Kokushikan University alumni
Association football people from Saitama Prefecture
Japanese footballers
J2 League players
Japan Football League players
Tokushima Vortis players
Giravanz Kitakyushu players
FC Gifu players
Suzuka Point Getters players
Association football defenders